Mattia Pasini (born 13 August 1985) is an Italian Grand Prix motorcycle road racer.

Career

Early career
Born in Rimini, Pasini participated in his first race at the age of 9.

125cc World Championship
After several successful years in the Italian and European championships, he made his 125cc world championship debut in 2004 as the teammate of Roberto Locatelli. He finished his first season in the 15th place overall, and earned the rookie of the year award. His best results were a 3rd place in Qualifying and a 7th place in the Malaysian Grand Prix.

The following year Pasini was running in the lead in most of the races and won the Chinese and Catalan Grands Prix. He finished the season in fourth place overall. In 2006 Pasini finished fourth overall once again, having won the Italian Grand Prix and the German Grand Prix.

The 2007 season started very badly as Pasini suffered from motorcycles malfunctions early in the year. That lowered his chances of winning the championship. Despite having four wins, one more than the championship leader Gábor Talmácsi and as many as the runner-up Héctor Faubel, Pasini ended the year in fifth place.

250cc World Championship
In 2008, Pasini rode in the 250cc class for Polaris World Aprilia team. He gained his first 250cc victory in the opening round of the season during the Qatar Grand Prix and secured three more podium finishes in the first five rounds. However, he failed to maintain such form and finished no higher than fifth in the remaining races. He finished the season 8th overall and was the rookie of the year.

2009 Pasini was victorious at Mugello, but generally struggled to match the frontrunners.

In 2009 he got a chance to test a Ducati MotoGP bike for Pramac Racing in order to evaluate him as a replacement for Mika Kallio who in turn replaced Casey Stoner at Ducati works team. After the test however, it was decided he would not be racing for Pramac in 2009.

Prior to the Portuguese Grand Prix in Pasini was forced to find a new team due to issues with Team Toth ability to pay for the leasing of bikes from Aprilia. This led to Daniel Epp assisting Pasini in financing the lease of bikes for the remainder of the season under the banner of Team Globalgest. The team acquired all of Pasini's mechanics from Toth and raced from the Emmi – Caffe Latte teams garage for the remainder of the season.

MotoGP World Championship
In January 2012, it was announced that Pasini was going to make the step up to MotoGP with the Speed Master team, replacing Anthony West, as he could not acquire the funds to retain the ride. He rode an Aprilia ART CRT bike. At Assen he achieved his best result with 10th place.

Return to Moto2
In 2016, Pasini made a full-time return to Moto2, racing a Kalex for Italtrans Racing. He closed the season in eleventh place in championship, having scored 72 points.

2020
For 2020, Pasini was an italian commentator for the Moto2 and Moto3 classes, before stepping in as a replacement driver for Red Bull KTM Ajo in the 2020 Emilia Romagna and Rimini's Coast motorcycle Grand Prix. He took Jorge Martin's bike and finished in 16th place, just one tenth of a second behind last-place scorer Stefano Manzi.

2022
In 2022, Pasini was a wildcard for two rounds, at Mugello and Misano driving for GasGas Aspar Team. At Mugello he shone, topping a free practice and showing more pace than his full-time teammates before choosing the wrong tyre for the race and falling to P15, still scoring his first points since Valencia 2019. At Misano he was fighting rookie sensation Pedro Acosta for 5th place before falling.
He also came back at Valencia for RW Racing, in place of the injured Barry Baltus. He had good pace during all the weekend and was several seconds faster than his teammate Zonta van den Goorbergh before qualifying P17. He bounced back during the race running 8th before being taken out by Jeremy Alcoba. He finished the championship in 31st place with just one point, still in front of other full-time riders.

Sportscar racing
Pasini made his four wheel debut with Inter Europol Competition racing a LMP3 class Ligier JS P320 in the 2021 European Le Mans Series at the 4 Hours of Barcelona.

Career statistics

Grand Prix motorcycle racing

By season

By class

Races by year
(key) (Races in bold indicate pole position; races in italics indicate fastest lap)

References

External links

1985 births
Living people
Sportspeople from Rimini
Italian motorcycle racers
Italian racing drivers
125cc World Championship riders
250cc World Championship riders
Moto2 World Championship riders
MotoGP World Championship riders